= NRANK =

Ranking of the rarity of a species

NRANK, or National Rank, is a ranking of the rarity of a species within a nation. Each nation can assign their own NRANK based on information from conservation data centres, natural heritage programmes, and expert scientists. Other sources of species endangerment levels come from a data bases from the IUCN. This list was first compiled in 1963 to highlight endangered species in each region as a way to allow conservation, called the Red List of Threatened Species.
